Paola Vidulich (born 20 April 1977) is a South African former field hockey player who competed in the 2000 Summer Olympics.

References

External links

1977 births
Living people
South African female field hockey players
Female field hockey goalkeepers
Olympic field hockey players of South Africa
Field hockey players at the 2000 Summer Olympics